The 3rd Vuelta a España (Tour of Spain), a long-distance bicycle stage race and one of the three grand tours, was held from 12 June to 6 July 1941. Delio Rodríguez won 12 of the 21 stages and finished in 4th place overall. Fermin Trueba won three stages and the mountains classification and finished only about one minute behind Julián Berrendero, in a race where the winner's time was nearly 170:00:00.

This was the first time that the Vuelta was won by a Spanish rider. The race was organized by "Educacion y Descanco", an organisation in the Franco dictatorship with the goal to promote arts, culture and sports. Teams from several countries (Belgium, France, Portugal, Switzerland, Germany, Italy and the Netherlands) were invited to send a team of four riders, but the countries involved in World War II were unwilling or unable to do so, and only riders from Spain and neutral Switzerland competed in the race.

Rodriguez rose to fame after this race and later became a significant figure in Spanish cycling history.

Teams and riders

Route

Results

Final General Classification

References

 
1941
1941 in Spanish sport
1941 in road cycling